Thaalibia Cemetery or Abd al-Rahman al-Tha'alibi Cemetery is a cemetery in the Casbah of Algiers in the commune of the Casbah of Algiers. The name "Thaalibia" is related to Abd al-Rahman al-Tha'alibi.

History 
This Islamic cemetery was founded in 1490 within the Casbah of Algiers, and comprises tombs of numerous Algerian theologians and notables.

Notable interments

Abd al-Rahman al-Tha'alibi
Abdelhalim Bensmaia

Ahmed Bey ben Mohamed Chérif

Ali Ben El-Haffaf
Ali Khodja
Boudjemaa Maknassi

Mohamed Bencheneb

Mohammed Racim

Omar Agha
Omar Racim
Ouali Dada
Sidi Abd Youssef
Sidi Abdallah
Sidi Betqa
Sidi Bougdour
Sidi Flih

Sidi Mansour
Sidi Ouadah
Youssef Pacha

Gallery

See also
Cemeteries of Algiers

References

1490 establishments
Cemeteries in Algeria
Buildings and structures in Algiers
15th-century establishments in Africa